Madar Junction is a Railway Station in Ajmer District, Rajasthan. It is located in Naka Madar area of Ajmer City. The station consists of three platforms, and a Coach Care Complex. Modification of this railway station is currently going on.

References

External links

Railway stations in Ajmer district
Ajmer railway division
Railway junction stations in Rajasthan